Peta Sergeant is a Malaysian-born Australian actress best known for her lead role in the Australian television series Satisfaction. She graduated from NIDA.

Career
Her other television credits include the television series All Saints, Winners & Losers, Last Man Standing, Jeopardy, Supergirl and Canal Road. Film credits include George of the Jungle 2, Patrick and The Bet. She received critical acclaim for her portrayal of a woman on the run in Steve Rodgers' play Savage River for the Griffin Theatre Company. Sergeant received praise as "a stand out performance amid an excellent cast" in Sue Smith's Thrall.

She was cast as Nina Cruz in the Melbourne Theatre Company production of All About My Mother, an adaptation for the stage based on the film by Pedro Almodóvar, directed by Simon Phillips. In 2012 she starred in Iron Sky, as Vivian Wagner, a campaign adviser to a Sarah Palin-like president of the United States, who later becomes general on the US' interplanetary warship USS George W. Bush.  In 2013 she starred in Patrick as Nurse Williams. In 2014 she played the Jabberwocky in Once Upon a Time in Wonderland and Francesca Guerrera in The Originals. In the 2015 telemovie House of Hancock, Sergeant portrayed Rose Porteous. She plays Julia in Snowfall.

In 2010 she was awarded a Mike Walsh Fellowships Special Grant. In 2021, Sergeant joined The CW's Supergirl as Nyxly.

Filmography

References

External links

Living people
People from Penang
Australian film actresses
Australian television actresses
Australian stage actresses
Australian people of Malaysian descent
Malaysian emigrants to Australia
1980 births